The 1973–74 New York Rangers season was the franchise's 48th season. The Rangers compiled 94 points during the regular season and finished third in the East Division. The team made the Stanley Cup playoffs, where New York defeated the Montreal Canadiens 4–2 in the quarter-finals. The Rangers then lost in a seven-game semi-finals series to the Philadelphia Flyers, who went on to win the Stanley Cup that season.

Offseason
On July 27, 1973, E. Michael Burke handed in his resignation to the New York Yankees, so that he could become president of Madison Square Garden. This would make Burke the president of the New York Rangers hockey club and the New York Knicks basketball club.

Regular season

Final standings

Schedule and results

|- align="center" bgcolor="#CCFFCC"
| 1 || 10 || Detroit Red Wings || 4–1 || 1–0–0
|- align="center" bgcolor="#CCFFCC"
| 2 || 13 || @ Pittsburgh Penguins || 8–2 || 2–0–0
|- align="center" bgcolor="white"
| 3 || 14 || Los Angeles Kings || 1–1 || 2–0–1
|- align="center" bgcolor="#CCFFCC"
| 4 || 17 || St. Louis Blues || 4–0 || 3–0–1
|- align="center" bgcolor="#FFBBBB"
| 5 || 20 || @ Toronto Maple Leafs || 3–2 || 3–1–1
|- align="center" bgcolor="#FFBBBB"
| 6 || 21 || Montreal Canadiens || 3–2 || 3–2–1
|- align="center" bgcolor="#FFBBBB"
| 7 || 27 || @ New York Islanders || 3–2 || 3–3–1
|- align="center" bgcolor="#FFBBBB"
| 8 || 28 || Pittsburgh Penguins || 7–2 || 3–4–1
|- align="center" bgcolor="white"
| 9 || 30 || @ Vancouver Canucks || 3–3 || 3–4–2
|-

|- align="center" bgcolor="#FFBBBB"
| 10 || 1 || @ Los Angeles Kings || 2–1 || 3–5–2
|- align="center" bgcolor="#FFBBBB"
| 11 || 4 || @ Chicago Black Hawks || 4–1 || 3–6–2
|- align="center" bgcolor="#CCFFCC"
| 12 || 7 || Boston Bruins || 7–3 || 4–6–2
|- align="center" bgcolor="white"
| 13 || 9 || @ Atlanta Flames || 3–3 || 4–6–3
|- align="center" bgcolor="#CCFFCC"
| 14 || 11 || New York Islanders || 5–2 || 5–6–3
|- align="center" bgcolor="white"
| 15 || 14 || Chicago Black Hawks || 4–4 || 5–6–4
|- align="center" bgcolor="#FFBBBB"
| 16 || 15 || @ Boston Bruins || 10–2 || 5–7–4
|- align="center" bgcolor="#CCFFCC"
| 17 || 17 || @ Minnesota North Stars || 6–3 || 6–7–4
|- align="center" bgcolor="#CCFFCC"
| 18 || 18 || Pittsburgh Penguins || 7–0 || 7–7–4
|- align="center" bgcolor="#CCFFCC"
| 19 || 21 || California Golden Seals || 3–0 || 8–7–4
|- align="center" bgcolor="#CCFFCC"
| 20 || 22 || @ Buffalo Sabres || 7–6 || 9–7–4
|- align="center" bgcolor="white"
| 21 || 24 || Los Angeles Kings || 5–5 || 9–7–5
|- align="center" bgcolor="#CCFFCC"
| 22 || 25 || Vancouver Canucks || 5–0 || 10–7–5
|- align="center" bgcolor="white"
| 23 || 29 || @ Philadelphia Flyers || 2–2 || 10–7–6
|-

|- align="center" bgcolor="white"
| 24 || 1 || @ St. Louis Blues || 4–4 || 10–7–7
|- align="center" bgcolor="#CCFFCC"
| 25 || 2 || Toronto Maple Leafs || 6–4 || 11–7–7
|- align="center" bgcolor="#CCFFCC"
| 26 || 5 || St. Louis Blues || 5–1 || 12–7–7
|- align="center" bgcolor="#FFBBBB"
| 27 || 6 || @ Buffalo Sabres || 8–4 || 12–8–7
|- align="center" bgcolor="#CCFFCC"
| 28 || 9 || California Golden Seals || 6–3 || 13–8–7
|- align="center" bgcolor="white"
| 29 || 12 || Buffalo Sabres || 1–1 || 13–8–8
|- align="center" bgcolor="white"
| 30 || 15 || @ Toronto Maple Leafs || 2–2 || 13–8–9
|- align="center" bgcolor="#FFBBBB"
| 31 || 16 || Chicago Black Hawks || 6–1 || 13–9–9
|- align="center" bgcolor="#CCFFCC"
| 32 || 20 || Detroit Red Wings || 5–2 || 14–9–9
|- align="center" bgcolor="#CCFFCC"
| 33 || 22 || @ Pittsburgh Penguins || 4–1 || 15–9–9
|- align="center" bgcolor="#FFBBBB"
| 34 || 23 || @ Atlanta Flames || 3–1 || 15–10–9
|- align="center" bgcolor="#CCFFCC"
| 35 || 26 || Philadelphia Flyers || 2–1 || 16–10–9
|- align="center" bgcolor="#FFBBBB"
| 36 || 29 || @ Montreal Canadiens || 7–1 || 16–11–9
|- align="center" bgcolor="#CCFFCC"
| 37 || 30 || Minnesota North Stars || 4–3 || 17–11–9
|-

|- align="center" bgcolor="#FFBBBB"
| 38 || 3 || @ Philadelphia Flyers || 4–2 || 17–12–9
|- align="center" bgcolor="#FFBBBB"
| 39 || 4 || Boston Bruins || 4–2 || 17–13–9
|- align="center" bgcolor="#CCFFCC"
| 40 || 6 || Atlanta Flames || 5–2 || 18–13–9
|- align="center" bgcolor="#FFBBBB"
| 41 || 10 || @ Buffalo Sabres || 7–2 || 18–14–9
|- align="center" bgcolor="#CCFFCC"
| 42 || 12 || @ Vancouver Canucks || 6–1 || 19–14–9
|- align="center" bgcolor="#CCFFCC"
| 43 || 13 || @ California Golden Seals || 7–2 || 20–14–9
|- align="center" bgcolor="white"
| 44 || 16 || @ Detroit Red Wings || 4–4 || 20–14–10
|- align="center" bgcolor="#FFBBBB"
| 45 || 17 || @ St. Louis Blues || 3–2 || 20–15–10
|- align="center" bgcolor="#CCFFCC"
| 46 || 19 || @ Chicago Black Hawks || 3–2 || 21–15–10
|- align="center" bgcolor="#CCFFCC"
| 47 || 23 || Atlanta Flames || 4–1 || 22–15–10
|- align="center" bgcolor="#CCFFCC"
| 48 || 27 || Los Angeles Kings || 5–3 || 23–15–10
|- align="center" bgcolor="#CCFFCC"
| 49 || 30 || @ Pittsburgh Penguins || 4–2 || 24–15–10
|-

|- align="center" bgcolor="#CCFFCC"
| 50 || 2 || @ Minnesota North Stars || 3–1 || 25–15–10
|- align="center" bgcolor="white"
| 51 || 3 || Minnesota North Stars || 5–5 || 25–15–11
|- align="center" bgcolor="#CCFFCC"
| 52 || 6 || New York Islanders || 6–0 || 26–15–11
|- align="center" bgcolor="#FFBBBB"
| 53 || 9 || @ Montreal Canadiens || 7–2 || 26–16–11
|- align="center" bgcolor="#CCFFCC"
| 54 || 10 || St. Louis Blues || 4–2 || 27–16–11
|- align="center" bgcolor="white"
| 55 || 14 || @ Philadelphia Flyers || 4–4 || 27–16–12
|- align="center" bgcolor="#CCFFCC"
| 56 || 16 || @ Vancouver Canucks || 9–4 || 28–16–12
|- align="center" bgcolor="#CCFFCC"
| 57 || 21 || @ Los Angeles Kings || 5–3 || 29–16–12
|- align="center" bgcolor="#CCFFCC"
| 58 || 22 || @ California Golden Seals || 4–3 || 30–16–12
|- align="center" bgcolor="#CCFFCC"
| 59 || 24 || Philadelphia Flyers || 3–2 || 31–16–12
|- align="center" bgcolor="#CCFFCC"
| 60 || 27 || Vancouver Canucks || 4–2 || 32–16–12
|-

|- align="center" bgcolor="#CCFFCC"
| 61 || 2 || @ Minnesota North Stars || 3–1 || 33–16–12
|- align="center" bgcolor="#CCFFCC"
| 62 || 3 || California Golden Seals || 8–2 || 34–16–12
|- align="center" bgcolor="#CCFFCC"
| 63 || 6 || Montreal Canadiens || 9–2 || 35–16–12
|- align="center" bgcolor="#FFBBBB"
| 64 || 9 || @ Montreal Canadiens || 4–2 || 35–17–12
|- align="center" bgcolor="#CCFFCC"
| 65 || 10 || New York Islanders || 4–2 || 36–17–12
|- align="center" bgcolor="#FFBBBB"
| 66 || 14 || Chicago Black Hawks || 5–2 || 36–18–12
|- align="center" bgcolor="#CCFFCC"
| 67 || 16 || @ New York Islanders || 3–1 || 37–18–12
|- align="center" bgcolor="#FFBBBB"
| 68 || 17 || @ Boston Bruins || 5–2 || 37–19–12
|- align="center" bgcolor="#FFBBBB"
| 69 || 20 || Vancouver Canucks || 7–5 || 37–20–12
|- align="center" bgcolor="white"
| 70 || 21 || @ Atlanta Flames || 5–5 || 37–20–13
|- align="center" bgcolor="#FFBBBB"
| 71 || 23 || @ Detroit Red Wings || 5–3 || 37–21–13
|- align="center" bgcolor="#CCFFCC"
| 72 || 24 || Buffalo Sabres || 5–3 || 38–21–13
|- align="center" bgcolor="#FFBBBB"
| 73 || 27 || Boston Bruins || 3–2 || 38–22–13
|- align="center" bgcolor="#FFBBBB"
| 74 || 30 || @ Toronto Maple Leafs || 7–3 || 38–23–13
|- align="center" bgcolor="white"
| 75 || 31 || Toronto Maple Leafs || 3–3 || 38–23–14
|-

|- align="center" bgcolor="#CCFFCC"
| 76 || 3 || Detroit Red Wings || 5–3 || 39–23–14
|- align="center" bgcolor="#FFBBBB"
| 77 || 6 || @ Detroit Red Wings || 8–3 || 39–24–14
|- align="center" bgcolor="#CCFFCC"
| 78 || 7 || Montreal Canadiens || 6–4 || 40–24–14
|-

Playoffs

Key:  Win  Loss

Player statistics
Skaters

Goaltenders

†Denotes player spent time with another team before joining Rangers. Stats reflect time with Rangers only.
‡Traded mid-season. Stats reflect time with Rangers only.

Awards and records

Transactions

Draft picks
New York's picks at the 1973 NHL Amateur Draft in Montreal, Quebec, Canada.

Farm teams

References

New York Rangers seasons
New York Rangers
New York Rangers
New York Rangers
New York Rangers
Madison Square Garden
1970s in Manhattan